The Spanish Communist Party (in ), was the first communist party in Spain, formed out of the Federación de Juventudes Socialistas (Federation of Socialist Youth, youth wing of Spanish Socialist Workers' Party). The founders of the party, that had belonged to leftwing within FJS, included Ramón Merino Gracia, Manuel Ugarte, Pedro Illescasm Luis Portela, Tiburicio Pico and Rito Estaban. Partido Comunista Español was formed on April 15, 1920. Its organ was called El Comunista.

Soon after its formation, on November 14, 1921, the party merged with Partido Comunista Obrero Español (Spanish Communist Workers' Party) and formed the Communist Party of Spain.

References

Political parties established in 1920
Communist parties in Spain
Political parties disestablished in 1921
1920 establishments in Spain

it:Partito Comunista Spagnolo